Heterixalus variabilis is a species of frog in the family Hyperoliidae endemic to Madagascar. Its natural habitats are moist savanna, subtropical or tropical seasonally wet or flooded lowland grassland, swamps, freshwater marshes, intermittent freshwater marshes, arable land, urban areas, heavily degraded former forests, ponds, irrigated land, seasonally flooded agricultural land, and canals and ditches.

References

Heterixalus
Amphibians described in 1930
Endemic frogs of Madagascar
Taxonomy articles created by Polbot